Edward French was a lawyer, civil war veteran, professor at Wells College, and early pioneer to California.

Starting in 1868, Professor Edward French taught Latin, literature, chemistry and mathematics at Wells College. He was induced to take a faculty position at Wells College by his wife to get her brother's new college up and running. French was also a botanist by avocation.

In 1888, French decided to move the family to Southern California, part of "a mass migration to Southern California promoted by an aggressive publicity campaign orchestrated by Los Angeles boosters and driven by a fare-price war between the Southern Pacific and Santa Fe railroads". French bought a small fruit ranch in Glendale, but the ranch failed to prosper, their home fire, the business collapsed in the depression of 1893, and the ranch was foreclosed at auction.

French took a job teaching in the Los Angeles public schools. With failing health (cataracts), he lost the teaching job. He lived out his days in the Los Angeles Old Soldiers' Home as a resident employee, taking a clerical position in the records office.

Family
Edward French was the son of Illinois governor Augustus C. French and Lucy Southwick French. He was the brother of Augusta French Wicker, husband of Mary Wells French, the brother-in-law of Wells Fargo and Company founder Henry Wells, the brother-in-law of railroad baron Cassius Milton Wicker, the father of Helen, and poet Nora May French.

References

Wells College faculty
Educators from California
Year of birth missing
Year of death missing